Michael Wayne Rosen (born 7 May 1946) is a British children's author, poet, presenter, political columnist, broadcaster and activist who has written 140 books. He served as Children's Laureate from 2007 to 2009.

Early life
Michael Wayne Rosen was born into a Jewish family in Harrow, Middlesex, on 7 May 1946. His ancestors were Jews from an area that is now Poland, Romania, and Russia, and his family had connections to The Workers Circle and the Jewish Labour Bund. His middle name was given to him in honour of Wayne C. Booth, a literary critic who was billeted with his father at Shrivenham American University.

Rosen's father, educationalist Harold Rosen (1919–2008), was born in Brockton, Massachusetts, but grew up in the East End of London from the age of two after his mother left his father and returned to her native England. Harold attended Davenant Foundation School and then Regent Street Polytechnic. He was a secondary school teacher before becoming a professor of English at the Institute of Education in London and publishing extensively, especially on the teaching of English to children.

Rosen's mother, Connie (née Isakofsky; 1920–1976), worked as a secretary at the Daily Worker and later as a primary school teacher and training college lecturer. She had attended Central Foundation Girls' School, where she made friends such as Bertha Sokoloff. She met Harold in 1935, when both were aged 15, as they were both members of the Young Communist League. They participated in the Battle of Cable Street together. As a young couple, they settled in Pinner, Middlesex. They left the Communist Party in 1957. Rosen never joined, but his parents' activities influenced his childhood. For example, their acquaintance with the bohemian literary figure Beatrice Hastings made an impression on him as a child.

At around the age of 11, Rosen began attending Harrow Weald County Grammar School. He attended state schools in Pinner and Harrow, as well as Watford Grammar School for Boys. Having discovered Jonathan Miller, he thought, "Wouldn't it be wonderful to know all about science, and know all about art, and be funny and urbane and all that?" His mother was then working for the BBC. Producing a programme featuring poetry, she persuaded him to write for it and used some of his material. He later said, "I went to Middlesex Hospital Medical School, started on the first part of a medical training, jacked it in and went on to do a degree in English at Oxford University. I then worked for the BBC until they chucked me out and I have been a freelance writer, broadcaster, lecturer, performer ever since—that's to say since 1972. Most of my books have been for children, but that's not how I started out. Sometime around the age of twelve and thirteen I began to get a sense that I liked writing, liked trying out different kinds of writing, I tried writing satirical poems about people I knew."

Career
In 1969, Rosen graduated from Wadham College, Oxford, and became a graduate trainee at the BBC. Among the work that he did while there in the 1970s was presenting a series on BBC Schools television called Walrus (write and learn, read, understand, speak). He was also scriptwriter on the children's reading series Sam on Boffs' Island, but Rosen found working for the corporation frustrating: "Their view of 'educational' was narrow. The machine had decided this was the direction to take. Your own creativity was down the spout."

Despite previously having made no secret of his leftist views when he was originally interviewed for a BBC post, he was asked to go freelance in 1972, though in practice he was sacked despite several departments of the BBC wishing to keep employing him. In common with the China expert and journalist Isabel Hilton, among several others at this time, Rosen had failed the vetting procedures which were then in operation. This longstanding practice was only revealed in 1985, and by the time Rosen requested access to his files, they had been destroyed.

In 1974, Mind Your Own Business, his first book of poetry for children, was published. In due course, Rosen established himself with his collections of humorous verse for children, including Wouldn't You Like to Know, You Tell Me and Quick Let's Get Out of Here. Educationalist Morag Styles has described Rosen as "one of the most significant figures in contemporary children's poetry" and one of the first poets "to draw closely on his own childhood experiences and to 'tell it as it was' in the ordinary language children actually use".

Rosen played a key role in opening up children's access to poetry, both through his own writing and with important anthologies such as Culture Shock. He was one of the first poets to make visits to schools throughout the UK and further afield in Australia, Canada and Singapore. His tours continue to enthuse and engage school children about poetry in the present.

We're Going on a Bear Hunt is a children's picture book written by Rosen and illustrated by Helen Oxenbury. The book won the overall Nestlé Smarties Book Prize in 1989 and also won the 0–5 years category. The publisher, Walker Books, celebrated the work's 25th anniversary in 2014 by breaking a Guinness World Record for the Largest Reading Lesson.

In 1993, Rosen gained an MA in Children's Literature from the University of Reading and subsequently gained a PhD from the University of North London. Margaret Meek Spencer supervised his work and continued to support him throughout her life.Rosen is well established as a broadcaster, presenting a range of documentary features on British radio. He is the presenter of BBC Radio 4's regular magazine programme Word of Mouth, which looks at the English language and the way it is used.

The English Association gave Michael Rosen's Sad Book (2004) an Exceptional Award for the Best Children's Illustrated Books of its year in the 4–11 age range. The book was written by Michael Rosen and illustrated by Quentin Blake. It deals in part with bereavement and followed the publication of Carrying the Elephant: A Memoir of Love and Loss, which was published in November 2002 after the death of his son Eddie (aged 18), who features as a child in much of his earlier poetry. Rosen's This Is Not My Nose: A Memoir of Illness and Recovery (2004) is an account of his ten years with undiagnosed hypothyroidism; a course of drugs in 1981 alleviated the condition.

In 2011, he collaborated with his wife, Emma-Louise Williams, to produce the film Under the Cranes, with Rosen providing the original screenplay (a play for voices called Hackney Streets), which Williams took as a basis with which to direct the film. It premiered at the Rio Cinema in Dalston, London, on 30 April 2011 as part of the East End Film Festival.

Rosen has previously taught children's literature on the MA in education studies at the University of North London and its successor institution, London Metropolitan University. He was formerly a visiting professor of children's literature at Birkbeck, University of London, where he taught children's literature and devised an MA in children's literature, which commenced in October 2010. Since September 2014, he has been at Goldsmiths, University of London, as professor of children's literature in the Department of Educational Studies, teaching an MA in children's literature.

He is also a patron of the Shakespeare Schools Festival, a charity that enables schoolchildren across the UK to perform Shakespeare in professional theatres.

Rosen was the subject of the BBC Radio 4's Desert Island Discs programme on 6 August 2006.

In March 2021, Rosen released the book Many Different Kinds of Love: A Story of Life, Death and the NHS, an account of his experience being hospitalised with COVID-19 a year earlier, including his own poem for the NHS 60th anniversary 'These are the Hands'  being pinned to his bed or wall.

Politics

Jeremy Corbyn
In August 2015, Rosen endorsed Jeremy Corbyn's leadership campaign in the Labour Party election. He contributed to Poets for Corbyn, an anthology of poems from 20 writers. In the same month, he was one of many Jewish public figures who signed an open letter criticising The Jewish Chronicles reporting of Corbyn's association with alleged antisemites. In 2016, along with others, he toured the UK to support Corbyn's bid to become Prime Minister.

In November 2019, along with other Jewish public figures, Rosen signed an open letter supporting Corbyn, describing him as "a beacon of hope in the struggle against emergent far-right nationalism, xenophobia and racism in much of the democratic world" and endorsing him in the 2019 UK general election. In December 2019, along with 42 other leading cultural figures, he signed an open letter endorsing the Labour Party under Corbyn's leadership in the 2019 general election. The letter stated that "Labour's election manifesto under Corbyn's leadership offers a transformative plan that prioritises the needs of people and the planet over private profit and the vested interests of a few".

Other
In August 2010, he contributed to an e-book collection of political poems entitled Emergency Verse – Poetry in Defence of the Welfare State, edited by Alan Morrison.

Rosen stood for election in June 2004 in London as a Respect Coalition candidate. He is a supporter of the Republic campaign. 

He has written columns for the Socialist Worker and spoken at conferences organised by the Socialist Workers Party.

Awards and honours

Rosen was appointed the sixth British Children's Laureate in June 2007, succeeding Jacqueline Wilson, and held the honour until June 2009, when he was succeeded by Anthony Browne. Rosen signed off from the Laureateship with an article in The Guardian, in which he said, "Sometimes when I sit with children when they have the space to talk and write about things, I have the feeling that I am privileged to be the kind of person who is asked to be part of it". In 2007, he was awarded an honorary doctorate by the University of Exeter.

In January 2008, Rosen was presented with an honorary doctorate by the Tavistock and Portman NHS Trust and the University of East London. In November 2008, he was presented with an honorary master's degree at the University of Worcester and the Chevalier de l'ordre des Arts et des Lettres (Knight of the Order of Arts and Literature) at the French ambassador's residence in London.

In April 2010, Rosen was given the Fred and Anne Jarvis Award from the National Union of Teachers for "campaigning for education". In July 2010, he was awarded an honorary doctorate by Nottingham Trent University.

In April 2011, Rosen was awarded an honorary doctorate at the Institute of Education, University of London, and in July 2011, an honorary doctorate by the University of the West of England. Rosen was selected to be the guest director of the 2013 Brighton Festival.

In 2021, Rosen received the annual J.M. Barrie Lifetime Achievement Award from the charity Action for Children's Arts, "in recognition of his tremendous work championing the arts for children as well as his achievements as a performer and author."

In 2022, Rosen was awarded an honorary fellowship of the Royal College of Nursing by an expectational and unanimous vote of the RCN Council during the organisation's annual congress; with RCN President Dr Denise Chaffer citing Rosen's lived experience, patient advocacy, and ongoing COVID-19 public awareness work as contributory factors.

Personal life
Rosen has been married three times and has five children and two step-children. His second son Eddie (1980–1999) died at the age of 18 from meningococcal septicaemia, and his death was the inspiration for Rosen's 2004 work Sad Book. Rosen lives in North London with his third wife, Emma-Louise Williams, and their two children.

In March 2020, during the COVID-19 pandemic, Rosen was admitted to hospital with suspected COVID-19. He was moved into the ICU and back to a ward, before again being moved back to ICU. He left the ICU after 47 days. He was moved to a ward at Whittington Hospital and returned home in June.

References

Other sources

.
; video on YouTube

Further reading

Articles

Book reviews

News reports

.
.
.
.
.
.
.

External links

 
 Michael Rosen blog (active March 2020)
 artificedesign, Rosen's official YouTube channel
 
 
 Michael Rosen at Penguin Readers' Group (archived 28 September 2013)
 

1946 births
Living people
20th-century British writers
21st-century British writers
Alumni of the University of North London
Alumni of the University of Reading
Alumni of Wadham College, Oxford
Anti-Zionist Jews
British Children's Laureate
Bundists
Chevaliers of the Ordre des Arts et des Lettres
Children's poets
English children's writers
English educational theorists
English Jewish writers
English Jews
English male novelists
English male poets
English people of American-Jewish descent
English people of Lithuanian-Jewish descent
English people of Polish-Jewish descent
English people of Romanian-Jewish descent
English people of Russian-Jewish descent
English republicans
English socialists
English YouTubers
Fellows of the Royal Society of Literature
Internet memes
Internet memes introduced in 2007
Jewish anti-Zionism in the United Kingdom
Jewish novelists
Jewish poets
Jewish socialists
Labour Party (UK) people
People educated at Watford Grammar School for Boys
People from Harrow, London
People from Pinner
Respect Party politicians
YouTube channels launched in 2007
Honorary Fellows of the Royal College of Nursing